The Val des Terres Hill Climb is a hillclimbing competition held in St Peter Port, Guernsey. The course is 850 yards (777 m) in length. The track has hosted a round (latterly two rounds) of the British Hill Climb Championship.

Val des Terres Hill Climb past winners

Key: R = Course Record.

References

See also

 Bouley Bay Hill Climb

Hillclimbs
Auto races in the United Kingdom
Sport in Guernsey